Benjamín Ernesto González Roaro (born 28 December 1954) is a Mexican politician from the National Action Party. He has served as Deputy of the LV and LX Legislatures of the Mexican Congress representing the Federal District.

References

1954 births
Living people
Politicians from Mexico City
National Autonomous University of Mexico alumni
National Action Party (Mexico) politicians
21st-century Mexican politicians
Deputies of the LX Legislature of Mexico
Members of the Chamber of Deputies (Mexico) for Mexico City